"La det swinge" ("Let it swing") is a Norwegian-language song by the pop duo Bobbysocks!. It was the winner of the Eurovision Song Contest 1985 and 's first victory in the contest. The song is a tribute to dancing to old rock 'n' roll heard on the radio. Befitting the subject matter, the song itself is written in an old-fashioned style, with a memorable saxophone melody starting the song. The melody arrangement is in retro style, containing elements of contemporary 1980s music and throwbacks to the 1950s. Following their win, the single peaked at number one in the Norwegian and Belgian singles chart, and entered the charts in various countries, including Denmark, Sweden, Switzerland, Austria, Ireland and the United Kingdom.

Eurovision
The song entered, and won the Norwegian final of ESC, Melodi Grand Prix, and was therefore selected to represent Norway in the Eurovision Song Contest 1985. For the performances, the two members of Bobbysocks!, Hanne Krogh and Elisabeth Andreassen, appeared in sparkling, bright purple jackets, worn over black and white outfits; Krogh sported a black-and-white striped floor-length gown. At the Eurovision Song Contest, the song was performed thirteenth on the night, following 's Al Bano and Romina Power with "Magic Oh Magic" and preceding the 's Vikki Watson with "Love Is". At the close of voting, it received 123 points, placing 1st in a field of 19. "La det swinge" was succeeded as Norwegian representative at the 1986 contest by Ketil Stokkan with "Romeo".

This was the second appearance for both Andreasson and Krogh in the Eurovision Song Contest: in  Andreassen had represented  in the duo Chips with Kikki Danielsson, singing "Dag efter dag"; and in  Krogh had finished 17th (second from last) in the contest, with the song "Lykken er". Krogh also returned to the Contest in 1991 as part of the group Just 4 Fun, finishing 17th with "Mrs. Thompson".

Track listing
"Let It Swing" – 2:50
"La det swinge" – 2:50

Charts

References

External links
"Let It Swing/La det swinge" at the Austrian singles chart
"Let It Swing/La det swinge" at the Norwegian singles chart
"Let It Swing/La det swinge" at the Swiss singles chart
"La det swinge" at the Swedish singles chart

1985 singles
Eurovision songs of Norway
Eurovision songs of 1985
Number-one singles in Norway
Eurovision Song Contest winning songs
Ingmar Nordströms songs
Bobbysocks! songs
Songs written by Rolf Løvland
Schlager songs
1985 songs